The term party school is used to refer to a college or university (usually in the United States) that has a reputation for heavy alcohol and drug use or a general culture of licentiousness at the expense of educational credibility and integrity. The most quoted list of alleged party schools is published annually by The Princeton Review. The magazine Playboy also releases a list of party schools on an irregular basis. Many schools bristle at the party school label, and the lists have been condemned by groups such as the American Medical Association for promoting dangerous behavior.

Famous party schools 
Here is the most recent list of notorious party schools in the United States, as reported by The Princeton Review in 2020. Ranking is determined by student ratings of alcohol and drug use on campus, the amount of time students spend studying outside of class, and the proportion of students involved in Greek Life.

 University of Alabama
 University of Delaware
 Syracuse University
 West Virginia University
 Tulane University
 University of Maine
 Union College
 Bucknell University
 Colgate University
 Wake Forest University
 University of California, Santa Barbara
 Elon University
 University of Rhode Island
 University of Wisconsin–Madison
 Sewanee: The University of the South
 St. Lawrence University
 University of Dayton
 University of Connecticut
 Florida State University
 Indiana University of Pennsylvania

Playboy
Playboy has published a list of party schools in 1987, 2002, 2006, and every year since 2009. The 1987 list included forty schools, with sixteen honorable mentions; California State University, Chico ranked first, a distinction that, according to the magazine, some students considered a burden. In 2002, the list featured twenty-five schools and ten honorable mentions and was topped by Arizona State University. The University of Wisconsin–Madison placed first among ten schools in 2006, and in 2009, the University of Miami gained the top spot out of 25, ranking highest in the "brains" category, as well as in the "bikini" category. The University of Texas at Austin took the top ranking in 2010, followed by the University of Colorado Boulder in 2011. In 2012, the University of Virginia was ranked #1, and in 2013, West Virginia University topped the list. Syracuse University topped the list (republished from The Princeton Review) in 2014.

It is widely believed that Playboy released additional lists of party schools in the past, but this claim has been debunked by Snopes.com. Playboy did describe the University of Wisconsin as "the party school" in a September 1968 issue, and deemed the University of California, Los Angeles "tops in campus action" in 1976. However, the magazine did not actually rank schools until January 1987. In 2009, Playboy announced it would make the list an annual feature in the magazine.

McGill University, in Montreal and the University of Western Ontario, in London, Ontario, are the only Canadian schools to have made the list.

Criticism of party school lists
In 2003, the American Medical Association requested that the Princeton Review remove the party school rankings from its college guides. Dr. Richard Yost, director of the AMA's Office of Alcohol and Other Drug Abuse, said, "The Princeton Review should be ashamed to publish something for students and parents that fuels the false notion that alcohol is central to the college experience and that ignores the dangerous consequences of high-risk drinking. College binge drinking is a major public health issue and a source of numerous problems for institutions of higher learning." The accuracy of The Princeton Review's rankings has also been questioned, especially with regards to the larger schools. Experts argue that the sample size of students surveyed at each college (three hundred students, on average) is not enough to provide a truthful depiction of student behavior. "It's positively unscientific," said Dr. Henry Wechsler of the Harvard School of Public Health College Alcohol Studies Program.

Administrators, professors, and many students at so-called "party schools" have tried to disassociate themselves from the rankings. For example, West Virginia University president Michael Garrison refused to give interviews about his school's appearance in the 2007–08 Princeton Review list. "I've talked to thousands of our students over the weekend and during the first days of classes. Their concerns are with their education, with their futures, and with the great year we have ahead at WVU," he said in a prepared statement.

COVID-19
Public relations aside, there were outbreaks of COVID-19 at "party schools" in September 2020 as they attempted to open to in-person learning in the Fall of 2020.

Notes

Further reading
 Armstrong, Elizabeth A., and Hamilton, Laura T. (2013). Paying for the Party: How College Maintains Inequality. Cambridge, MA: Harvard University Press. .

External links
 Snopes article, with Playboy's 2014 rankings

School types
Student culture in the United States
Playboy